The arboreal salamander (Aneides lugubris) is a species of climbing salamander. An insectivore, it is native to California and Baja California, where it is primarily associated with oak and sycamore woodlands, and thick chaparral.

Description
Aneides lugubris is  SVL (snout-vent length), with plain purplish-brown coloring, usually spotted dorsally with gold or yellow, although it may also be unspotted. The tail is prehensile. The juvenile is dark overall, clouded with greyish color and fine yellow speckling on the back. The male of this species can be distinguished by its broad triangular head, with the front teeth of the jaw extending beyond the bottom lip.

This species is an excellent climber and difficult to capture. It is nocturnal, spending daylight hours and dry periods in the cavities of oak trees, often with many other individuals of its species. A large adult can inflict a painful bite. Arboreal Salamanders hatch from eggs laid and guarded in burrows. Hatchling size is 24 mm SVL, age at maturity is 2.69 yr, and average adult age is 8–11 yr. Annual survival probability increases with age from 0.363 in age 0 to 0.783 in ages >4 yr.

Because they are plethodontid (plethodontidae) salamanders they are lungless and breathe through their skin.  They can produce sounds which have been compared to a faintly barking dog.

Subspecies
Farallon Island salamander – A. l. farallonensis (Van Denburgh, 1905)
A. l. lugubris (Van Denburgh, 1905)

These subspecies have been proposed in the past due to genetic and morphological differences, but they are not currently recognized.

Gallery

References

External links

 Fisher, R. N. and T. J. Case. "A Field Guide to the Reptiles and Amphibians of Coastal Southern California." USGS.
 AmphibiaWeb - Aneides lugubris
 Caudata Culture Entry - Aneides lugubris
 California Herps Profile

Aneides
Amphibians of Mexico
Amphibians of the United States
Fauna of California
Extant Miocene first appearances
Amphibians described in 1849
Taxa named by Edward Hallowell (herpetologist)